Stenoptilodes limaicus is a moth of the family Pterophoridae that is known from Peru.

Adults are on wing in January.

External links

limaicus
Moths described in 1996
Endemic fauna of Peru
Moths of South America